Orocrambus mylites is a moth in the family Crambidae. It was described by Edward Meyrick in 1888. It is endemic to New Zealand, where it has been recorded in Nelson and Marlborough. It is found in the alpine zone.

The wingspan is 19–25 mm. The forewings are bluish-brown with greyish fascia. Adults are on wing from December to February.

The larvae feed on Chionochloa australis.

References

Crambinae
Moths described in 1888
Endemic fauna of New Zealand
Moths of New Zealand
Taxa named by Edward Meyrick
Endemic moths of New Zealand